Diablo Data Systems was a division of Xerox created by the acquisition of Diablo Systems Inc. 
for US$29 million in 1972, a company which had been founded in 1969 by George E. Comstock, Charles L. Waggoner and others.

The company was best known for the HyType I and HyType II typewriter-based computer terminals, the Diablo 630 daisywheel printers, as well as removable hard disk drives that were used in the Xerox Alto computer and resold by DEC as the RK02 and RK03.

Overview

The RK02 and RK03 drives that Diablo made for Digital Equipment Corporation (DEC) was described by DEC as "stores digital data in serial format on IBM 2315 type disk cartridges." It differed from what DEC later manufacturered for itself, rather than rebadging as "the RK04 and RK05 use voice coil head positioning, and the RK02 and RK03 use rack and pinion head positioning."

The RK02/RK04 were low density and stored 600K 16-bit words, whereas the RK03/RK05 store 1.2 megabytes of 16-bit words. By using "12 sectors of 128 words (low density) or 256 words (high density)" and "203 cylinders of 2 tracks per cylinder" that was 1.22 megabytes or 2.45 megabytes respectively.

Diablo also made full computer systems as well as printers.

Diablo systems

The Xerox Diablo 3100 was among the complete computing systems sold by Diablo.

Diablo printers
Among the models for which Diablo was known were the 9R87201, the HyType I (1973) and the HyType II. Some of the printwheels were plastic, others were "metalized." Also included were the Diablo 630 and 635.

References

Further reading

Xerox
1969 establishments in California
1972 establishments in California
1972 mergers and acquisitions
American companies established in 1969
American companies disestablished in 1972
Computer companies established in 1969
Computer companies disestablished in 1972
Defunct computer companies based in California
Defunct computer companies of the United States
Defunct computer hardware companies
Manufacturing companies established in 1969
Manufacturing companies disestablished in 1972
Technology companies established in 1969
Technology companies disestablished in 1972
Database companies